David Bronson Ingram (born 1962/1963) is an American heir, businessman and philanthropist. He is the chairman and president of Ingram Entertainment, the largest distributor of DVDs and video games in the US. He is the founder and chairman of DBI Beverage, a distributor of California beers and non-alcoholic drinks in Chico, Napa, Sacramento, San Francisco, San Joaquin County, San Jose, Truckee and Ukiah.

Early life
Ingram's late father was E. Bronson Ingram II, founder of Ingram Industries. His mother is Martha Rivers Ingram and his brothers are Orrin H. Ingram II and John R. Ingram. His paternal grandfather five times removed, David Ingram, was an immigrant from Leeds, England. His paternal great-great-grandfather, Orrin Henry Ingram, was a lumber baron in Eau Claire, Wisconsin and early invested in Friedrich Weyerhäuser's timber investments, later known as the Weyerhaeuser corporation.

Ingram received a bachelor's degree in history from Duke University in 1985 and an MBA from the Owen Graduate School of Management at Vanderbilt University in May 1989.

Business career
He was development officer of Duke University from 1985 to 1987. He was CEO of Ingram Entertainment until 2012.

He is the chairman of Ingram Entertainment, and the founder and chairman of DBI Beverage. He serves on the board of directors of Pinnacle Financial Partners Inc. Formerly, he served on the boards of BUY.com, Goldleaf Financial Solutions,Inc. and Ingram Micro.

Philanthropy
He is chairman of the board of trustees of Montgomery Bell Academy. He serves as president of The Golf Club of Tennessee and head of the investment committee for the Tennessee Golf Foundation. He is a member of the Augusta National Golf Club. In September 2005, he made a $100,000 gift to the American Red Cross Disaster Relief Fund to help victims of Hurricane Katrina. In January 2010, he made a $100,000 donation to the Red Cross International Relief Fund to help the victims of the 2010 Haiti earthquake.  In November 2013, he donated $100,000 to the American Red Cross Philippines Relief Fund to help victims of the Philippines typhoon disaster.

As of September 2019, Ingram and his wife Sarah LeBrun Ingram had donated a combined $5,600 to U.S. President Donald Trump's 2020 reelection campaign.

Personal life
In 1989, he married Sarah LeBrun, a member of the Duke University women's golf team whom he met when they were students. Sarah LeBrun Ingram went on to win the U.S. Women's Mid-Amateur three times and was elected to the Tennessee Golf Hall of Fame. She elected not to turn pro in order remain in Nashville to raise their two sons.

References

Living people
Duke University Trinity College of Arts and Sciences alumni
Vanderbilt University alumni
Businesspeople from Tennessee
American chief executives
Philanthropists from Tennessee
American people of English descent
Ingram family
1960 births